Laveni Vaka (born August 11, 2001) is a footballer who plays as a defender for BYU Cougars. Born in the United States, she is a Tonga international.

Career

Vaka started her career with BYU Cougars in the United States.

References

External links

Living people
2001 births
American people of Tongan descent
American women's soccer players
Brigham Young University alumni
BYU Cougars women's soccer players
Women's association football defenders